National Lampoon's Dorm Daze 2: College @ Sea is a 2006 American direct-to-video American mystery comedy film and the sequel to National Lampoon Presents Dorm Daze (2003). Chris Owen and Danielle Fishel reprised their roles from the original along with Tony Denman, James DeBello, Patrick Cavanaugh, Marieh Delfino, Jennifer Lyons, and Gable Carr. Added to the ensemble are Vida Guerra, Charles Shaughnessy, Richard Riehle, Jasmin St. Claire, Oren Skoog and Justin Whalin. The film was directed by the brothers David and Scott Hillenbrand and written by long-time collaborators Patrick Casey and Worm Miller.

The music of UK Swing Band Dominic Halpin and the Honey B's is featured in this film along with a score composed by David Hillenbrand.

Plot
The film unfolds during a Semester-at-Sea-type cruise in the Caribbean. The class from Billingsly University are trying to put on a play to win a contest. Sexy and scheming Gerri and stoner Pete are competing for a scholarship. Newmar is trying to have sex with Violet, his Christian girlfriend. Rusty is just trying to have sex with anything he can. The creepy Dante runs around planning all sorts of nefarious schemes. Meanwhile, a priceless stolen jewel is loose on the boat and everyone is after it.

Cast

Production
The film was shot on location in California, primarily aboard the Queen Mary, docked in the Port of Long Beach.

Release
The film had its premiere screening at the Directors Guild of America Building in Hollywood on June 14, 2006.

Home media
The film was released on DVD September 5, 2006.  It debuted at number 28 on the U.S. rental box office charts bringing in $790,000 in its first five days.

Sequel
A third film was planned but was reworked into what became Transylmania, released in 2009.

References

External links
 
 

Dorm Daze 2
2006 films
2000s comedy mystery films
2000s teen comedy films
2006 independent films
2006 direct-to-video films
American independent films
American comedy mystery films
American teen comedy films
Direct-to-video sequel films
2000s English-language films
Films set on ships
Films shot in California
Films with screenplays by Patrick Casey (writer)
Films with screenplays by Josh Miller (filmmaker)
2006 comedy films
2000s American films
English-language comedy films